Numminen is a village in the southern part of the Mäntsälä municipality near the border of Pornainen in Uusimaa, Finland. More than 300 inhabitants live in the village.

There are three historic manors in the village: Nordbo (Ulriksdal), Ylikartano (Andersberg) and Alikartano (Frugård). Numminen has own primary school completed in 2013. The village includes the sports club Nummisten Vilkas and a hunting club.

One of the notable residents is a Sámi visual artist Outi Pieski, who lives part of her time in Numminen. Also, the famous arctic explorer Adolf Erik Nordenskiöld lived his childhood in the Alikartano manor.

See also
 Mäntsälä (village)
 Kirveskoski
 Järvenpää

References

External links
 Nummisten kylä – Official Site (in Finnish)

Mäntsälä
Villages in Finland